The 2021 Metro Atlantic Athletic Conference men's basketball tournament was the postseason men's basketball tournament for the Metro Atlantic Athletic Conference for the 2020–21 NCAA Division I men's basketball season. The tournament was played from March 8–13, 2021 at the Jim Whelan Boardwalk Hall in Atlantic City, New Jersey for the second year in a row. Since 2020's tournament was never fully completed, the defending champions were the 2018–19 Iona Gaels. 

No. 9 seeded Iona won the 2021 MAAC Men's Basketball Tournament, defeating No. 7 seed Fairfield 60–51 in the championship game for their MAAC leading 13th championship. Their tournament run included knocking off top-seeded Siena in the quarterfinals, improving their record against the Saints in the MAAC Tournament to 11–0. This made it five consecutive MAAC Tournament championships for Iona, and the first time that a No. 9 seed reached and won the championship game. Iona received the MAAC's automatic bid to the 2021 NCAA tournament and were given a No. 15 seed.

Seeds
All 11 teams in the conference participated in the tournament. The top five teams received byes to the quarterfinals. New procedures took effect for this season, as it was official that not all MAAC teams reached the originally scheduled 20 conference game mark. Team seeding was based on overall conference regular season wins – not including any third games scheduled between teams in lieu of non-conference opponents. A tiebreaker system to seed teams with identical conference records was also used.

Schedule

Bracket

* denotes number of overtimes

Game summaries

First round

Quarterfinals

Semifinals

Championship

Team and tournament leaders

Team leaders

All-championship team

See also
 2021 MAAC women's basketball tournament

References

Tournament
2021
College basketball tournaments in New Jersey
Sports competitions in Atlantic City, New Jersey
2021 in sports in New Jersey
March 2021 sports events in the United States